Alfred Lif (26 March 1908 – 16 May 1980) was a Swedish cross-country skier. He won the Swedish 50 kilometers national championship in 1935. and in 1939 he won Vasaloppet.

Also competing in alpine skiing, he participated in the 1937 Swedish national championships.

References 

1980 deaths
Swedish male alpine skiers
Swedish male cross-country skiers
Vasaloppet winners
1908 births
20th-century Swedish people